Post and beam is a general term for building with heavy timbers. More specific types of post and beam framing are:
Timber framing, an ancient traditional method of building using wooden joinery held together with pegs, wedges and rarely iron straps
Post and lintel, a simple form of framing with lintels resting on top of posts
Ständerhaus, a type of post and beam construction used in North German farmhouses